Jeff Rowe may refer to:
 Jeff Rowe (American football)
 Jeff Rowe (filmmaker)